The Paraguayan Footballer of the Year is an award given to the best Paraguayan professional football player every year. The award began officially in 1997 and it is presented by Paraguayan newspaper ABC Color. Players that participate in this award can play in any professional football club in the world (although they do not necessarily have to be Paraguayan football clubs) and have to be either Paraguayan-born or Paraguayan-naturalised players.

A second award, voted by the public, was established in 2004. Justo Villar was the inaugural winner.

Winners

Journalists' vote

Public vote

Notes

References

Footballers in Paraguay
Association football player of the year awards by nationality
1997 establishments in Paraguay
Awards established in 1997
Paraguayan awards
Annual events in Paraguay
Association football player non-biographical articles